Kenneth O. Preston (born February 18, 1957) is a retired United States Army soldier who served as the Sergeant Major of the Army. He was sworn in as the 13th Sergeant Major of the Army on January 15, 2004. Preston served 7 years and 2 months as Sergeant Major of the Army (January 2004-March 2011) making him the longest serving Sergeant Major of the Army to date.

Early life and education
Preston is a native of Mount Savage, Maryland, and entered the United States Army on June 30, 1975. He attended Basic Training in A Company, 11th Training Battalion, 5th Training Brigade, Fort Knox, Kentucky and Armor Advanced Individual Training in D Company, 3rd Training Battalion, 1st Training Brigade Fort Knox, Kentucky, graduating in October 1975.

Military career

Throughout his 36-year career, Preston served in every enlisted leadership position from cavalry scout and tank commander to his position as Sergeant Major of the Army. Other assignments he held as a command sergeant major were 3rd Battalion, 8th Cavalry Regiment, 1st Cavalry Division, Fort Hood, Texas, 3rd "Grey Wolf" Brigade, 1st Cavalry Division, 1st Armored Division in Bad Kreuznach, Germany, and V Corps in Heidelberg, Germany. Immediately prior to his appointment as Sergeant Major of the Army, he was the command sergeant major of Combined Joint Task Force 7 serving in Baghdad, Iraq.

As Sergeant Major of the Army, Preston served as the personal adviser to the Chief of Staff of the United States Army on all soldier-related matters, particularly in all areas affecting soldier manning, equipping, training, education and quality of life. These areas included growing an all-volunteer force across all three components of the army by 100,000 during a time of war; fielding individual combat uniforms, body armor, weapons and up-armored vehicles; training leaders and their units for deployment in support of Operation Enduring Freedom in Afghanistan and Operation Iraqi Freedom in Iraq; transitioning the noncommissioned officer education system at all levels to support an Army at war; advocated for dwell time between deployments and co-signed the Army Family Covenant with the Secretary of the Army and Chief of Staff of the Army. He was routinely invited to testify before US Congress.

Preston's military education includes the Basic Noncommissioned Officer's Course, Advanced Noncommissioned Officer's Course, First Sergeant's Course, M1/M1A1 Tank Master Gunner Course, Master Fitness Trainer Course, Battle Staff Noncommissioned Officer's Course, and the United States Army Sergeants Major Academy. His civilian education includes an Associate of Arts degree in vocational education and instruction from the University of Louisville and both a Bachelor of Science degree in business administration and a Master of Business Administration degree from Trident University International.

Post-military career

Since August 2011, Preston has volunteered as the co-chair of the Chief of Staff of the Army's Retired Soldier Counsel. The 14-member counsel works with the Army staff, supporting agencies and subject matter experts to review all recommendations and issues submitted from the field impacting retired soldiers and surviving spouses from the Army. The counsel prepares a final report with all recommendations for the Chief of Staff of the Army.

Preston also volunteers as a member the Board of Directors for Homes for Our Troops since October 2011. Home for Our Troops is a nonprofit organization with the mission to build and donate specially adapted homes to severely wounded veterans at no cost. Severely wounded veterans in need of a specially adapted home as qualified by the VA predominantly spend all or part of their daily life in a wheelchair. Many of these veterans are young with young children. A specially adapted home allows the veteran total access to all rooms in the home to including a child's nursery, use of all kitchen and laundry facilities and garage to support their reintegration back into their family and their community.

Preston has served as the Vice President of noncommissioned officer and soldier programs at the Association of the United States Army (AUSA) since May 2013. AUSA is the Army's professional educational association and serves as a voice for the Army and support for the soldier.

Awards and decorations

References

External links

US Army Site
SMA tours Iraq with message of Transformation

Sergeants Major of the Army. CMH Pub. 70-63-1. By CSM Daniel K. Elder, et al. Describes the origin and growth of the Office of the Sergeant Major of the Army. Includes biographies of each of the Sergeants Major of the Army.

Tank personnel
Recipients of the Distinguished Service Medal (US Army)
Recipients of the Legion of Merit
People from Mount Savage, Maryland
1957 births
Living people
Sergeants Major of the Army
University of Louisville alumni
Recipients of the Meritorious Service Medal (United States)
Military personnel from Maryland